Charles Rupert Cubitt (1890–1968) was a pioneer Australian rugby league footballer who played in the 1910s.

Playing career
Charlie Cubitt played with Glebe for two seasons between (1911–1912). Charlie Cubitt was the older brother of the rugby league footballer; Les Cubitt.

Cubitt played in the 1911 NSWRL grand final against Eastern Suburbs which ended in a 11–8 loss despite Cubitt scoring 2 tries in the match.  Cubitt played on in 1912 as Glebe finished as runners up in the competition to Easts yet again.  Eastern Suburbs won the premiership by coming first and no grand final was contested to determine a winner.

Cubitt died on 20 September 1968, aged 77.

References

Glebe rugby league players
Australian rugby league players
1890 births
1968 deaths
Rugby league players from Sydney
Rugby league centres
Rugby league wingers
Rugby league five-eighths